Mehbudi may refer to:
 Mehbudi-ye Olya
 Mehbudi-ye Sofla